Devara Konda is a village in Tirupati district, Andhra Pradesh, India. The name appears to come from the title of a small hill, Devara Konda (God's Hill; a temple sits on that hill).

References

Villages in Tirupati district